No Way Down is the second and final extended play by Swedish indie pop duo Air France. It was released on 26 June 2008 by Sincerely Yours.

Reception 

No Way Down was met with generally positive reviews from critics. The online music magazine Pitchfork placed No Way Down at number 14 on its list of the top 50 albums of 2008 and at number 161 on its list of the top 200 albums of the 2000s.

Track listing

Personnel 
Credits for No Way Down adapted from album liner notes.

Air France
Joel Karlsson
Henrik Markstedt

Additional personnel
 Philip Granqvist – mastering
 Teresa Jaksetič – vocals on "June Evenings", "Collapsing at Your Doorstep" and "No Way Down"
 Elisabet Sjögren – vocals on "June Evenings"
 Kristian Spång – bass

References 

2008 albums
Air France (band) albums